Ernesto Federico Michel (born October 12, 1970 in Paraná, Entre Ríos) is a retired male basketball player (2.00 metres) from Argentina, who competed for his native country at the 1996 Summer Olympics in Atlanta, Georgia, finishing in ninth place in the overall-rankings. He was nicknamed "Nito" during his career.

References
sports-reference

1970 births
Living people
Argentine men's basketball players
Olympic basketball players of Argentina
Basketball players at the 1996 Summer Olympics
People from Paraná, Entre Ríos
Argentine people of German descent
Estudiantes de Bahía Blanca basketball players
Atenas basketball players
Quilmes de Mar del Plata basketball players
Libertad de Sunchales basketball players
Gimnasia y Esgrima de Comodoro Rivadavia basketball players
Sportspeople from Entre Ríos Province